William C. Frey (July 24, 1919 – February 16, 1979) was a United States district judge of the United States District Court for the District of Arizona.

Education and career

Born in Tucson, Arizona, Frey was in the United States Army as a Major during World War II, from 1941 to 1946. He received a Bachelor of Arts degree from the University of Arizona in 1947 and a Juris Doctor from the James E. Rogers College of Law at the University of Arizona in 1950. He was in private practice in Tucson from 1949 to 1950. He was an assistant state attorney general of Arizona from 1953 to 1955, returning to private practice in Tucson from 1956 to 1964. He was then a judge of the Superior Court of Pima County, Arizona from 1964 to 1970.

Federal judicial service

On October 7, 1970, Frey was nominated by President Richard Nixon to a new seat on the United States District Court for the District of Arizona created by 84 Stat. 294. He was confirmed by the United States Senate on November 25, 1970, and received his commission on December 1, 1970, serving in that capacity until his death on February 16, 1979, of a massive heart attack while vacationing on an island off the coast of Honduras. Frey had suffered a heart attack five years earlier.

References

Sources
 

1919 births
1979 deaths
University of Arizona alumni
James E. Rogers College of Law alumni
Arizona state court judges
Judges of the United States District Court for the District of Arizona
United States district court judges appointed by Richard Nixon
20th-century American judges
United States Army officers